Merry Christmas to You is the thirteenth studio album and first Christmas album by American country music singer Reba McEntire, with most of the tunes being McEntire's renditions of very familiar traditional Christmas fare. It was released on November 27, 1987, by MCA Nashville. It is her last albums to bear her surname on the front cover. Songs from the album would not chart until ten and twelve years after its release.

Track listing

Personnel

Musicians

 John Barlow Jarvis – keyboards (1, 2) 
 Matt Betton – drums (1, 2)
 Tom Brumley – steel guitar (1, 2)
 Larry Byrom – electric guitar (1, 2) 
 Bill Cooley – acoustic guitar (3-10), electric guitar (3-10)
 Vince Gill – backing vocals (2)
 Emory Gordy Jr. – bass (1, 2)
 Suzy Hoskins – backing vocals (3-10) 
 Donny Howard – acoustic piano (3-10) 
 Donnie LaValley – steel guitar (3-10)

 Mac McAnally – acoustic guitar (1, 2)
 Reba McEntire – lead vocals, arrangements (1, 3, 5, 6), backing vocals (3-10)
 Farrell Morris – chimes (1, 2), vibraphone (1, 2) 
 Mark O'Connor – fiddle (1, 2)
 Leigh Reynolds – acoustic guitar (3-10), backing vocals (3-10)
 Steve Short – drums (3-10)
 Ricky Solomon – fiddle (3-10)
 Billy Joe Walker Jr. – electric guitar (1, 2) 
 Roger Wills – bass (3-10)

Production

 
 Chuck Ainlay – mixing (1, 2) 
 Milan Bogdan – digital editing
 Jimmy Bowen – producer (3-10)
 Tony Brown – producer (1, 2)
 Bob Bullock – overdub recording (3-10), mixing (3-10)
 Mark J. Coddington – second engineer (3-10) 
 Katherine DeVault – design 
 J. Jacklyn Furriers – fur
 Tim Kish – second engineer (3-10) 
 Simon Levy – art direction

 Russ Martin – second engineer (3-10) 
 Glenn Meadows – mastering
 Reba McEntire – producer (3-10) 
 Jim McGuire – photography
 Jesse Noble – project coordinator 
 Ann Payne – styling
 Willie Pevear – overdub recording (3-10)
 Steve Tillisch – recording engineer (1, 2), mixing (1, 2), overdub recording (3-10)
 Ron Treat – recording engineer (3-10)
 Marty Williams – second engineer (3-10)

 Mixed at The Castle (Franklin, Tennessee).
 Mastered at Masterfonics (Nashville, Tennessee).

Charts

Album

Singles

Certifications and sales

References

Reba McEntire albums
1987 Christmas albums
Albums produced by Jimmy Bowen
Albums produced by Tony Brown (record producer)
Christmas albums by American artists
Country Christmas albums
MCA Records albums